"You" is a song by English singer Shaznay Lewis. Written by Lewis and Rick Nowels for her debut solo album Open (2004), it was released as the album's second and final single in 2004. The song peaked at number 56 on the UK Singles Chart.

Music video
The music video for the song consists of Lewis walking on the beach on a full moon night thinking of her boyfriend. In the video, Lewis encounters several instances of her surroundings that contain elements of a face, including clouds and cliffs. The face is that of Lewis's husband, Christian Storm.

Track listings

Notes
  denotes additional producer

Personnel and credits 
Credits adapted from the liner notes of Open.

 Rusty Anderson – electric guitar
 Curt Bisquera – drums
 Paul Bushnell – bass
 Nikki Harris – background vocals
 Charles Judge – keyboards, strings
 Greg Kurstin – keyboards, organ

 Shaznay Lewis – lyrics and music, vocals
 Rick Nowels  – instruments, lyrics and music, producer
 Jofin Noyce – bass
 Wayne Rodriques – drum programmer
 Chris Tsangarides – keyboards

Charts

References 

2004 singles
Songs written by Rick Nowels
Songs written by Shaznay Lewis
2004 songs
Song recordings produced by Rick Nowels
London Records singles